Courtlandt Dixon Barnes Bryan (April 22, 1936 – December 15, 2009), better known as C. D. B. Bryan, was an American author and journalist.

Biography
He was born on April 22, 1936 in Manhattan, New York City. His parents were Joseph Bryan III and Katharine Barnes Bryan; after they divorced his mother married author John O'Hara.

Bryan attended Berkshire School in the class of 1954 and earned a Bachelor of Arts at Yale University in 1958, where he wrote for campus humor magazine The Yale Record.  He was also a member of the fraternity St. Anthony Hall. 

He served in the U.S. Army in South Korea (1958–1960), but not happily.  He was mobilized again (1961–1962) for the Berlin Crisis of 1961. He was an intelligence officer.

Bryan sold his first short story to The New Yorker in 1961.

He was editor of the satirical Monocle (from 1961 until 1965), Colorado State University writer-in-residence (winter 1967), visiting lecturer University of Iowa writers workshop (1967–1969), special editorial consultant at Yale (1970), visiting professor University of Wyoming (1975), adjunct professor Columbia University (1976), fiction director at the New York City Writers Community from (1977), lecturer in English University of Virginia (spring 1983), and Bard Center fellow Bard College (spring 1984).

His first novel, P. S. Wilkinson, won the Harper Prize in 1965.

Bryan is best known for his non-fiction book Friendly Fire (1976).  It began as an idea he sold to William Shawn for an article in The New Yorker, then grew into a series of articles, and then a book.  It describes an Iowa farm family, Gene and Peg Mullen, and their reaction and change of heart after their son's accidental death by friendly fire in the Vietnam War. One of the real-life characters featured in the book was future Operation Desert Storm commander H. Norman Schwarzkopf.

It was made into an Emmy-winning 1979 television movie of the same name, for which he shared a Peabody Award.  It's also been cited in professional military studies.

Bryan died from cancer on December 15, 2009 at his home in Guilford, Connecticut.

Works
Bryan contributed articles to many periodicals, including The New York Times, The New York Times Magazine, The New York Times Book Review, The New Yorker, The New Republic, Esquire, Harper's, Saturday Review, and The Weekly Standard. He additionally author the narration for the 1963 Swedish film The Face of War.

Books (non-fiction)
 Friendly Fire. New York City: G. P. Putnam's Sons, 1976.
Adapted by Fay Kanin into the 1979 television movie of the same name. A Book-of-the-Month Club selected alternate.
 The National Air and Space Museum. New York City: Abrams Books, 1979.
A Book-of-the-Month Club selected alternate. Second edition included photographs by Jonathan Wallen, 1988.
 The National Geographic Society: 100 Years of Adventure and Discovery. New York City: Abrams Books, 1987.
 Close Encounters of the Fourth Kind: Alien Abduction, UFOs and the Conference at M.I.T.. New York City: Alfred A. Knopf, 1995. .

Books (novels)
 P. S. Wilkinson. New York City: Harper & Row, 1965.
"Portions of this novel appeared originally in The New Yorker."
 The Great Dethriffe. New York City: Dutton, 1970.
 Beautiful Women; Ugly Scenes. New York City: Doubleday, 1983. .
A Literary Guild alternate.

Book contributions
 "Introduction." In the Eye of Desert Storm: Photographers of the Gulf War. New York City: Harry N. Abrams, Inc. / Professional Photography Division of Eastman Kodak Company, 1991.  / .

Book reviews
 "By War Possessed." Review of Winners and Losers by Gloria Emerson. Saturday Review, February 5, 1977, pp. 22-23.
 "Combat Junky." Review of A Rumor of War by Philip Caputo. Saturday Review, June 11, 1977, pp. 36-37.

Short stories
 "So Much Unfairness of Things." The New Yorker, June 2, 1962, p. 31. Full text available.

A Literary Guild selection.

References

Bibliography
 Connery, Thomas B. (ed.). Sourcebook of American Literary Journalism. Westport, CT: Greenwood Press, 1992.
 Contemporary Literary Criticism, Vol 29. Detroit: Gale, 1984.
 Dictionary of Literary Biography, Volume 185: American Literary Journalists, 1945–1995. Detroit: Gale, 1997.
 Schroeder, Eric James. Vietnam, We've All Been There: Interviews with American Writers. Westport, CT: Praeger, 1992.
 Sims, Norman (ed.). The Literary Journalists. New York City: Ballantine, 1984, p. 3.
 Atlantic, July 1976; August 1983.
 Atlantic Monthly, July 1976, p. 93; August 1983, pp. 96–98.
 Boston Herald, June 13, 1995.
 Chicago Tribune Book World, October 9, 1983.
 The Christian Science Monitor, June 11, 1976.
 Commonweal, February 19, 1965, pp. 672–673.
 Los Angeles Times Book Review, August 28, 1983.
 National Review, April 20, 1971.
 New Republic, November 7, 1970.
 Newsweek, November 23, 1970; May 17, 1976.
 The New Yorker, July 31, 1995.
 New York Review of Books, April 8, 1965; August 5, 1976, pp. 41–43.
 The New York Times, February 1, 1965; October 21, 1970; May 12, 1976; August 9, 1983.
 The New York Times Book Review, January 31, 1965, p. 4; November 1, 1970, pp. 46–47; May 9, 1976, pp. 1–2; October 14, 1979; August 28, 1983, pp. 10, 15; June 11, 1995.
 Publishers Weekly, April 24, 1995.
 Saturday Review, February 6, 1965; January 22, 1972; May 15, 1976.
 Time magazine, February 5, 1965, pp. 112, 114; April 19, 1976.
 Times Literary Supplement, October 7, 1965; December 29, 1972, p. 1573.
 The Washington Post, October 24, 1979; June 5, 1995.
 Washington Post Book World, December 27, 1970, p. 6; May 2, 1976, p. L5; August 21, 1983, p. 3.

External links
 Boxes in the Attic ("Stories discovered inside 67 boxes of books, letters, photos and other items left to me and my sisters by our father, author C.D.B. Bryan, who passed away in December of 2009") – reminiscences about Bryan by his son, Saint George Bryan.
 C. D. B. Bryan Papers. Yale Collection of American Literature, Beinecke Rare Book and Manuscript Library, Yale University.

1936 births
2009 deaths
Deaths from cancer in Connecticut
American male journalists
Journalists from New York City
United States Army officers
Novelists from Connecticut
Writers from New York City
20th-century American novelists
Military intelligence
Hotchkiss School alumni
Berkshire School alumni
The Yale Record alumni
American male novelists
20th-century American male writers
Novelists from New York (state)
20th-century American non-fiction writers
St. Anthony Hall